White Australian may refer to:

 European Australians, Australians with European ancestry
 Anglo-Celtic Australians, an Australian with ancestry from the British Isles
 White people, who are Australians

See also
 White Australia policy, a 1901 policy that permitted only Anglo and then later European migration
 Australian (disambiguation)
 Australian White (disambiguation)
 Australiana often pertains to stereotypical cultural objects of colonial Australia 
 Australians
Ethnic groups in Australia